Facial implants are used to enhance certain features of the face. The surgery may be elective, or needed as the result of prior surgery on the face. Each involves placing synthetic materials deep under the subcutaneous tissue and onto the underlying bone. A maxillofacial or plastic surgeon uses them to aesthetically improve facial contours, proportion and correct imbalances caused by injury or hereditary traits. However, in cases that require orthognathic osteotomies, those should be done before any implants are considered.

In most cases, facial implant surgery is completed on an outpatient basis in a hospital, a surgeon's office or a surgical center. A local anesthesia or oral sedative may be used, or the patient may be put to sleep during the procedure using general anesthesia.

The most commonly used implants are:
Chin implant – These can be used to increase anterior, lateral and downward projection of the chin. The implant is placed internally through the lower lip, or externally under the chin. Sutures will vary depending on the approach.

Cheek implants – The implants are placed either through incisions inside the upper lip or through the lower eyelid. Sutures will vary depending on the approach.

Less commonly used implants are:
Jaw angle implants – These can be placed individually, in pairs, or as a large wraparound implant that includes the chin. They are used to increase lateral and/or downward projection of the ramus. They are placed through incisions inside the lower lip. The incision site will be secured with sutures that will dissolve in about one week.

Paranasal implant – This involves placing a specially designed implant between the nose and upper lip to increase anterior projection of the upper jaw. It is inserted through a small incision inside the mouth.

References

Plastic surgery
Implants